The 15th European Badminton Championships were held in Herning, Denmark, between 13 and 20 April 1996, and hosted by the European Badminton Union and the Danmarks Badminton Forbund.

Medalists

Results

Semi-finals

Finals

Medal account

References
 Results at BE
 Denmark Sweeps Euro Championships

European Badminton Championships
European Badminton Championships
B
B
Sport in Herning